Falls International Airport  is a city-owned public-use airport located in International Falls, a city in Koochiching County, Minnesota, United States. It is mostly used for general aviation but is also served by one commercial airline with scheduled passenger service subsidized by the Essential Air Service program.

As per Federal Aviation Administration records, the airport had 16,590 passenger boardings (enplanements) in calendar year 2008, 15,861 enplanements in 2009, and 14,051 in 2010. It is included in the National Plan of Integrated Airport Systems for 2017–2021, which categorized it as a primary commercial service airport (more than 10,000 enplanements per year).

Facilities and aircraft
Falls International Airport covers an area of 681 acres (276 ha) at an elevation of 1,185 feet (361 m) above mean sea level. It has two asphalt paved runways: 13/31 is 7,400 by 150 feet (2,256 x 46 m) and 4/22 is 2,999 by 75 feet (914 x 23 m).

For the 12-month period ending December 31, 2015, the airport had 39,900 aircraft operations, an average of 109 per day: 88% general aviation, 6% scheduled commercial, 6% air taxi and <1% military. In March 2017, there were 20 aircraft based at this airport: all 20 single-engine.

Airline and destination

Passenger

Cargo

Top destinations

History 
In 2020 the airport received a $1,070,873 CARES Act award.

See also
There are two small airports on the Canadian side:
 Fort Frances Municipal Airport – small general aviation airport in Fort Frances, Ontario
 Fort Frances Water Aerodrome – private floatplane base on Rainy Lake

References

Other sources

 Essential Air Service documents (Docket DOT-OST-2009-0160) from the U.S. Department of Transportation:
 Ninety-day notice (July 14, 2009): from Mesaba Aviation, Inc. of its intent to discontinue unsubsidized scheduled air service at the following communities, effective October 12, 2009: Paducah, KY; Alpena, MI; Muskegon, MI; Hancock, MI; Sault Ste. Marie, MI; International Falls, MN; Tupelo, MS and Eau Claire, WI.
 Essential Air Service documents (Docket OST-2009-0304) from the U.S. Department of Transportation:
 Memorandum (November 19, 2009): closing out docket DOT-2009-0160 and opening up eight new dockets for the various communities (Alpena, MI; Eau Claire, WI; Hancock/Houghton, MI; International Falls, MN; Muskegon, MI; Paducah, KY; Sault Ste. Marie, MI; Tupelo, MS).
 Order 2010-5-18 (May 13, 2010): setting final past-period subsidy rates for Mesaba Airlines, Inc., d/b/a Delta Connection, for its forced service at Alpena and Sault Ste. Marie, Michigan, International Falls, Minnesota, and Tupelo, Mississippi. Also selecting Mesaba to provide essential air service (EAS) at three of these four communities on a prospective basis. At the fourth community, Tupelo, we are tentatively selecting Mesaba to provide service based on a pro-rata application of the rate Mesaba agreed to which the staff applied to a reduced service level.
 Ninety Day Notice (July 15, 2011): from MESABA AVIATION, INC. and PINNACLE AIRLINES, INC. of termination of service at International Falls, MN.
 Order 2011-9-5 (September 13, 2011): prohibiting suspension of service and requesting proposals
 Order 2012-4-8 (April 5, 2012): selecting Great Lakes Aviation, Ltd., to provide Essential Air Service (EAS) at International Falls, Minnesota, for $993,247 annual subsidy. The service is to consist of 18 nonstop round trips per week to Minneapolis (MSP) year round with 19-seat Beech 1900 aircraft.
 Order 2012-6-3 (June 6, 2012): extending the Essential Air Service obligation of the two wholly owned subsidiaries of Pinnacle Airlines Corporation – Mesaba Aviation, Inc. and Pinnacle Airlines, d/b/a Delta Connection at the eight communities listed below (Muscle Shoals, AL; Alpena, MI; Iron Mountain/Kingsford, MI; Brainerd, MN; International Falls, MN; Greenville, MS; Laurel/Hattiesburg, MS; Tupelo, MS) for 30 days, through, July 9, 2012.

External links
 Falls International Airport, official website
 International Falls Airport at City of International Falls website
   at Minnesota DOT Airport Directory
 Aerial image as of May 1991 from USGS The National Map
 

Airports in Minnesota
Essential Air Service
Buildings and structures in Koochiching County, Minnesota
Transportation in Koochiching County, Minnesota
International Falls, Minnesota